William Bell, Jr. (born July 30, 1930) is a former pitcher who played in the Negro American League in all or part of four seasons spanning 1949–1954. Born in Des Moines, Iowa, he batted and threw left handed.

'Bill Lefty', as he was nicknamed, was renowned for his ability to work the corners of the plate. He started his career with the Kansas City Monarchs in 1949, pitching with both the Monarchs and the Birmingham Black Barons in 1950 and continuing with the Monarchs until early 1951, when his career was interrupted for military service in the Korean War from 1951 to 1953.

During service, Bell continued to pitching in games that were played between mixed teams of whites and blacks. Among others, he had teammates like Vernon Law and Syd Thrift, both Pittsburgh Pirates pitchers, as well as New York Giants outfielder Willie Mays. Following his discharge, Bell pitched briefly for the Monarchs in 1954.

After his baseball days, Bell returned to his hometown of Des Moines, Iowa and worked in the U.S. Postal Service, serving in various supervisory and management positions during 34 years. In addition, he was the co-chairman of the Committee for Better Race Relations at Des Moines East High School between 1972 and 1974.

Besides, Bell coached a local youth baseball team in the Babe Ruth League for three years, and guided the squad to one Iowa State tournament title.

In 2008, Major League Baseball staged a special draft of the surviving Negro league players, doing a tribute for the surviving Negro leaguers who were kept out of the Big Leagues because of their race. Hall of Fame Baseball player Dave Winfield hatched the idea to have this draft, which was held before the 2008 MLB Draft. MLB clubs each selected a former NLB player, and Bell was drafted as a pitcher by the Minnesota Twins.

Sources

External links
Negro Leagues Baseball Museum
William Bell Jr. Oral History

1930 births
Living people
African-American baseball players
American military personnel of the Korean War
Baseball pitchers
Birmingham Black Barons players
Kansas City Monarchs players
Baseball players from Des Moines, Iowa
Military personnel from Iowa
20th-century African-American sportspeople
21st-century African-American people